Holy Trinity Greek Orthodox Church may refer to:

in Australia
 Holy Trinity Church, North Hobart
 Holy Trinity Greek Orthodox Church, Surry Hills

in Austria
Holy Trinity Greek Orthodox Church, Vienna

in England
Greek Orthodox Church of the Holy Trinity, Brighton

in the United States
(by state)
Holy Trinity Greek Orthodox Church (San Francisco, California)
Holy Trinity Greek Orthodox Church (Wilmington, Delaware)
Holy Trinity Greek Orthodox Church (Sioux City, Iowa), listed on the NRHP in Woodbury County, Iowa
Holy Trinity Greek Orthodox Church (Lowell, Massachusetts), NRHP-listed
Archdiocesan Cathedral of the Holy Trinity, New York, New York
First Methodist Episcopal-Holy Trinity Greek Orthodox Church, Steubenville, Ohio, listed on the NRHP in Jefferson County, Ohio
Holy Trinity Greek Orthodox Church (Tulsa, Oklahoma)
Holy Trinity Cathedral (Salt Lake City), Utah, listed on the NRHP as Holy Trinity Greek Orthodox Church

See also
Holy Trinity Church (disambiguation)